Quixadá is a municipality in the state of Ceará, in Brazil. 
It is known for its unusual rock formations, known locally as monoliths.

Location
It was founded in 1870 and had a population of 80,605 residents in 2010, according to the Brazilian census. It is the seat of the Roman Catholic Diocese of Quixadá.

Pre-historic cave paintings and other archaeological remains have been found in the vicinity.
The municipality contains the  Quixadá Monoliths Natural Monument, a fully protected area around and containing the highly unusual inselbergs known locally as monoliths, which are of considerable tourist interest.
The Barragem do Cedro (Cedar Dam) was built between 1890 and 1906 using stone masonry, cement and steel, at the foot of the Pedra da Galinha Choca (Brooding Hen Rock), the most famous of the monoliths. On 30 January 2015 the dam was placed on the tentative list as a UNESCO World Heritage Site.

History
Until the 1760s, the indigenous tribes of Kanindé and Jenipapo populated the territory that is known as Quixadá. The fact that it used to be the land of indigenous is the explanation on why Quixadá does not have a Portuguese name. The conflicts between these groups and the Portuguese led to their extinction.

Sports
Quixadá Futebol Clube is the town's soccer club.

Quixadá is a major paragliding spot in Brazil. It is famous for many flight distance world record breaks in the last years, and attracts pilots from around the world every November when potential record-breaking conditions set up.

Hang gliding and climbing are other extreme sports popular in the area.

Culture
The more known figure of Quixadá is Rachel de Queiroz. A writer that portrayed the drought of 1915 in her novel "O Quinze (1930)," which later received national recognition. Queiroz was not born in Quixadá, but lived there for most of her life. 
In Quixadá, you can find three places dedicated to her: Memorial Rachel de Queiroz—former Chalé da Pedra --, Museu Rachel de Queiroz, located in her small farm, the Fazenda Não Me Deixes, and the Rachel de Queiroz Cultural Center.

Gallery

References

Municipalities in Ceará